National Football League is the highest level of play in professional American football in the United States.

National Football League may also refer to:

Association football
  or National Football League, an association football league in the Czech Republic
 National Football League (Fiji), an association football league in Fiji
 National Association Football League (sometimes referred to as the National Football League), an association football league in the United States
 National Football League (India), an association football league in India
 Russian National Football League, former name of an association football league in Russia
 National Football League (Rwanda), an association football league in Rwanda
 Singapore National Football League
 National Football League (South Africa), a defunct association football league in South Africa

Other football codes
 Australian National Football Council or National Football League, a former organizational body for Australian rules football
 Ladies' National Football League, a ladies' Gaelic football league in Ireland
 National Football League (1902), a defunct American football league
 National Football League (Ireland), a Gaelic football league in Ireland

See also
 , an association football competition in France
  or National League, an association football league in Israel
 National Football League Cheerleading, the cheerleading league associated with the American NFL
 NFL (disambiguation)